Merritton is both a distinct community within and a council ward of St. Catharines, Ontario, Canada. It was named after William Hamilton Merritt, a prominent local entrepreneur and founder of the Welland Canal Company. Until 1858, Merritton was named Welland City, but exchanged names that year with Merrittsville (Today's Welland City), when that town became the "seat" of Welland county.

Merritton was also previously known as Slabtown and Centreville. It became part of the city of St. Catharines in 1961. Prior to amalgamation which saw the original city of St. Catharines absorb several satellite towns, Merritton was a separate entity (along with Port Dalhousie). This led to the population of St. Catharines becoming more than twice as large. To this day, residents maintain a sense of distinct community identity. The original town hall, on Merritt St., once the City of St. Catharines Museum, is now home to the St. Catharines Senior's Centre.

As a former industrial centre on the Welland Canal, Merritton contains various heritage sites. Among them are the Merritton Tunnel (under the third Welland Canal), remnants of the three previous Welland Canals and several early industrial ruins, and The Keg restaurant, which is housed in the former Independent Rubber Company / Merritton Cotton Mills Annex. The Stone Mill Inn and  Ballroom, Johnny Rocco's Italian Grill, and several other businesses are housed in the old Lybster Mill building which was built in 1860. The area has undergone a major infrastructure facelift involving the re-alignment of Glendale Avenue, the replacement of the Merritt Street Bridge. Two commercial plazas were built in the 2000s on opposite sides of Glendale Avenue near Merritt Street with a Sobeys grocery store, LCBO liquor store, Starbucks, Swiss Chalet, as well as several other restaurants, and branches of the Royal Bank and Scotia Bank. A new fire hall was built in 2013. Merritton is also experiencing a significant increase in residential construction, especially on property designated as brownfield by the city.

See also 
 Merritton Tunnel

References

External links
The Merritton Website
Merritton community website

Neighbourhoods in St. Catharines